The Nativity is a 1978 American made-for-television biographical drama film starring Madeleine Stowe as Mary, set around the Nativity of Jesus and based on the accounts in the canonical Gospels of Matthew and Luke, in the apocryphal gospels of Pseudo-Matthew and James, and in the Golden Legend.  It was directed by Bernard L. Kowalski, written by Morton S. Fine and Millard Kaufman, and filmed in Almería, Spain.

Cast
 Madeleine Stowe as Mary
 John Shea as Joseph
 Jane Wyatt as Anna
 Paul Stewart as Zacharias
 Audrey Totter as Elizabeth
 George Voskovec as Joachim
 Freddie Jones as Diomedes
 John Rhys-Davies as Nestor
 W. Morgan Sheppard as Flavius
 Kate O'Mara as Salome
 Leo McKern as Herod
 Geoffrey Beevers as Eleazar

Home Video
The film was released on VHS on October 16, 2001.

See also
Life of the Virgin
 List of Christmas films

References

External links

1978 television films
1978 films
1970s biographical drama films
1970s Christmas drama films
1970s Christmas films
ABC network original films
American biographical drama films
Films about the Nativity of Jesus
Films directed by Bernard L. Kowalski
Nativity of Jesus on television
Depictions of Herod the Great on film
Gospel of Matthew
Gospel of Luke
Films scored by Lalo Schifrin
Christmas television films
20th Century Fox Television films
Films shot in Almería
1970s American films